Gavade Ambere is a village in Ratnagiri district in western India. It had a population of 2,194, according to the 2011 Census of India.

Gavade comes from the surname of a family living there before the 1940s. Ambere stems from Alphanso Mangoes (in Marathi it is called Amba), for which the area is known. Hence, the name of the village is Gavade Ambere.

Various religious and community people reside in this village. This village is known for work of several legends like Pramod Nathuram Tivarekar, Sudhakar Kumbhar, Kishor Shivanekar, Late Rajjak kazi, Sandip Birje, Sonu Dongre and Gajanan Birje. These people supported the village all the time to get out from the critical situations and rural development.

Places To Visit:
 Best of Nature
 Vishveshwer Temple
 Long Beach
 Satparya River 
 Jakadevi and Jugadevi Temples
 Tivarekar wadi Cricket ground
 Muchkundi Khadi

Nearest place: Purnagad Fort, Swami Swarupanand Mandir.

References 

Villages in Ratnagiri district